Margrit Hess (born 23 May 1947) is a Swiss middle-distance runner. She competed in the women's 1500 metres at the 1972 Summer Olympics.

References

External links
 

1947 births
Living people
Athletes (track and field) at the 1972 Summer Olympics
Swiss female middle-distance runners
Olympic athletes of Switzerland
Place of birth missing (living people)